Muhammad Anwar bin Ibrahim (born 10 June 1999) is a Malaysian footballer who plays for Kuala Lumpur City as a right-back. He was part of the team that won the 2021 Malaysia Cup.

Career statistics

Club

Honours

Club
Felda United
 Malaysia Premier League: 2018 

Kuala Lumpur City
 Malaysia Cup: 2021
 AFC Cup runner-up: 2022

International
Malaysia U-19
 AFF U-19 Youth Championship: 2018, runner-up 2017

References

External links
 

1999 births
Living people
People from Kelantan
Malaysian footballers
Felda United F.C. players
Selangor FA players
Kuala Lumpur City F.C. players
Malaysia Premier League players
Malaysia Super League players
Association football defenders